Alianza UAFC is a football (soccer) club from Guadalupe, Nuevo León, Mexico.They play in the Tercera División (fifth tier) of the Federación Mexicana de Fútbol Asociación.

History

UNETEFAN was created in 2007 as a dream; to be a community of football fans in Mexico, where the fanatics had voice and vote in the decisions of their team.

With the motto "Football is going to change" the first goal was set, to arrive at 1000 fans.

The fans of the new team voted for the name, the colors and the badge in an open competition.

Current squad

Roster 2010/11 

 Roster Update at 24 September  2010.

Stadium

The team plays in Unidad Deportiva La Talaverna

See also
List of fan-owned sports teams

External links
 Official Website

Football clubs in Nuevo León
Association football clubs established in 2008
2008 establishments in Mexico